Saint Aglibert may refer to:

 Agilbert (fl. c. 650–680), second bishop of the West Saxon kingdom and later bishop of Paris
 Agilbert of Créteil, martyred around AD 400